Erin L. Thompson is an American art historian and lawyer. She is a professor in the Department of Art and Music at the John Jay College of Criminal Justice (City University of New York). She studies art crime, including antiquities looting, the deliberate destruction of art, and art produced by detainees at the Guantánamo Bay military detention camp.

Career 
Thompson graduated from Barnard College in 2002. She holds a J.D. from Columbia Law School and a Ph.D. in art history from Columbia University. She has written about art theft, repatriation cases, and ISIS destruction of ancient art and archeological sites like Palmyra, Syria. She has given a TEDx talk on "Terrorists and Archeologists: How the Past Belongs to the Present". Thompson also testified as an expert witness in the 5Pointz graffiti art case.

In 2015, Thompson co-curated the exhibit "The Missing: Rebuilding the Past" at the Andrew and Anya Shiva Gallery, John Jay College, which included works by artists and scholars, such as Morehshin Allahyari, who protest ISIS and other forms of destruction of the past through creative protests and reconstructions.

Ode to the Sea exhibit 

In 2017, Thompson co-curated the exhibit "Ode to the Sea: Art from Guantánamo" at the President’s Gallery, John Jay College, New York. The exhibit included works created at Guantánamo Bay Detention Camp by eight detainees, half of whom are still detained. Due to the response to the exhibit, the Pentagon prohibited any further artwork from leaving Guantánamo. Thompson appeared on The Opposition with Jordan Klepper to defend the exhibit.

Controversy 

In June 2020, during the protests following the murder of George Floyd, Thompson publicly commented on a video showing protesters preparing to tear down a Minneapolis statue of Christopher Columbus, saying that, "I'm a professor who studies the deliberate destruction of cultural heritage and I just have to say... use chain instead of rope and it'll go faster." Fox News commentator Tucker Carlson accused Thompson of encouraging the destruction of public art, acts which she previously described as "damag[ing]... to humanity's shared heritage."

Bibliography 

 Possession: The Curious History of Private Collectors from Antiquity to the Present (Yale, 2016). Named an NPR Best Book of 2016.
 "Op Ed: Art Censorship at Guantánamo Bay," New York Times (November 27, 2017).
 "What We Can Learn From Art Painted Inside Guantánamo," The Nation (December 4, 2017).
 "Art from Guantánamo," Paris Review Daily (October 2, 2017).
 "Palmyra in Winter," The Kenyon Review (July/August 2017).
 "Hobby Lobby’s Antiquities Trouble," Sapiens (July 10, 2017).
 "Why People Collect Art," Aeon (August 23, 2016).
 "If We Return Nazi-Looted Art, The Same Goes for Empire-Looted," Aeon (July 5, 2016).
 “Op Ed: Islamic State’s War on Art Turns a Profit,” Bloomberg View (May 18, 2015).
 “Op Ed: Restrict Imports of Antiquities from Syria to Cut Down on Looting,” New York Times (October 9, 2014).
 “Op Ed: Egypt’s Looted Antiquities,” New York Times (May 30, 2014).

References

External links
 The Missing: Rebuilding the Past
 Ode to the Sea: Art from Guantánamo
 

Living people
American art historians
John Jay College of Criminal Justice faculty
Year of birth missing (living people)
Columbia Law School alumni
Columbia Graduate School of Arts and Sciences alumni
Women art historians
21st-century American historians
21st-century American women writers
American women historians
Barnard College alumni